The 2010 Global Champions Tour was the 5th edition of the Global Champions Tour (GCT), an important international show jumping competition series. The series was held mainly in Europe, one competition was held outside of Europe. All competitions were endowed at least 285000 €. All GCT events was held as CSI 5*.

The competitions was held between May 7, 2010 and August 29, 2010. There was no final. At the end of the season the best 18 riders in the final overall standings has got a bonus prize money, in total 1,000,000 €

Competitions 

All competitions are held as competition over two rounds against the clock with one jump-off against the clock.

1st Competition: Global Champions Tour of Spain 
May 7, 2010 to May 9, 2010 – Museo de las Ciencias Príncipe Felipe, Ciutat de les Arts i les Ciències, Valencia, 
Competition: Saturday, May 8, 2010 – Start: 4:00 pm, prize money: 285000 €

(Top 3 of 49 Competitors)

2nd Competition: Global Champions Tour of Germany 
May 13, 2010 to May 16, 2010 – Hamburg (German show jumping and dressage derby), 
Competition: Saturday, May 15, 2010 – Start: 2:00 pm, prize money: 285000 €

(Top 3 of 50 Competitors)

3rd Competition: Global Champions Tour of Italy 
May 20, 2010 to May 23, 2010 – La Mandria near Turino, 
Competition: Saturday, May 22, 2010 – Start: 2:00 pm, prize money: 300000 €

(Top 3 of 46 Competitors)

4th Competition: France I 
June 10, 2010 to June 12, 2010 – Cannes, 
Competition: Saturday, June 12, 2010 – Start: 6:00 pm, prize money: 285000 €

(Top 3 of 43 Competitors)

5th Competition: Global Champions Tour of Monaco 
June 24, 2010 to June 26, 2010 – shore at the marina „Port Hercule“, Monte Carlo, 
Competition: Saturday, June 26, 2010 – Start: 6:00 pm, prize money: 285000 €

(Top 3 of 44 Competitors)

6th Competition: Global Champions Tour of Portugal 
July 1, 2010 to July 3, 2010 – Hipódromo Manuel Possolo, Cascais near Estoril, 
Competition: Saturday, July 3, 2010 – Start: 7:00 pm, prize money: 325000 € (show jumping grand prix with the second-highest prize money in Europe)

(Top 3 of 41 Competitors)

7th Competition: France II 
July 23, 2010 to July 25, 2010 – Chantilly Racecourse, Chantilly, 
Competition: Saturday, July 24, 2010 – Start: 3:30 pm, prize money: 285000 €

(Top 3 of 49 Competitors)

8th Competition: Global Champions Tour of the Netherlands 
August 13, 2010 to August 15, 2010 – Valkenswaard, 
Competition: Saturday, August 14, 2010 – Start: 1:45 pm, prize money: 285000 €

(Top 3 of 50 Competitors)

9th Competition: Global Champions Tour of Brasil 
August 26, 2010 to August 28, 2010 – equestrian facility of the Sociedade Hípica Brasileira, Rio de Janeiro (Athina Onassis International Horse Show), 
Competition: Saturday, August 28, 2010 – Start: 4:30 pm, prize money: 300000 €

(Top 3 of 37 Competitors)

Final standings 

(Top 5), 7 results count for the final standingMarcus Ehning: Nach dem Triumph kam der Euro-Regen, Dieter Ludwig (german)

References 

Global Champions Tour
Global Champions Tour